Millu (Aymara for a kind of salpeter, Quechua for salty, Hispanicized spelling Millo) is a mountain in the Andes of Peru, about  high. It is situated in the Ayacucho Region, Parinacochas Province, Coracora District. Millu lies northwest of Puka Punchu and northeast of Q'illu Urqu.

References 

Mountains of Peru
Mountains of Ayacucho Region